The Australian Film Institute Award for Best Sponsored Documentary was an award presented by the Australian Film Institute (AFI). It was presented at the Australian Film Institute Awards (known commonly as the AFI Awards), which are now the AACTA Awards after the establishment of the Australian Academy of Cinema and Television Arts (AACTA), by the AFI. The award was handed out from 1983-1986.

Winners
Source:

See also
AACTA Award for Best Feature Length Documentary
AACTA Award for Best Documentary Under One Hour
AACTA Award for Best Documentary Series
Australian Film Institute Award for Best Documentary
Australian Film Institute Award for Best Television Documentary
AACTA Awards

References

External links
The Australian Academy of Cinema and Television Arts Official website

S